Wynn is a given name and nickname. People with the first name Wynn include:

Wynn Bullock (1902–1975), American photographer
Wynn Chamberlain (1927–2014), American artist, filmmaker and author
Wynn Edwards (1842–1900), American farmer and politician
Wynn Everett (born 1978), American actress
Wynn Handman (born 1922), American theatre director
Wynn Harmon (born 1960) American stage and screen actor
Wynn Hawkins (born 1936), American baseball player and executive
Wynn Mercere, American fantasy author
Wynn Normington Hugh-Jones (born 1923), British diplomat and politician
Wynn Roberts (actor), Australian television actor
Wynn Roberts (biathlete) (born 1988), American athlete
Wynn Schwartz (born 1950), American psychologist
Wynn Speece (1917–2007), American radio personality
Wynn Stewart (1934–1985), American country music singer-songwriter and guitarist
Wynn Underwood (1927–2005), American attorney and politician
Wynn Varble, contemporary American country music performer and songwriter

See also
Wynn (surname)
Wynn (disambiguation)
Win (disambiguation)